Anne Sexton (born Anne Gray Harvey; November 9, 1928 – October 4, 1974) was an American poet known for her highly personal, confessional verse. She won the Pulitzer Prize for poetry in 1967 for her book Live or Die. Her poetry details her long battle with bipolar disorder, suicidal tendencies, and intimate details from her private life, including relationships with her husband and children, whom it was later alleged she physically and sexually assaulted.

Early life and family
Anne Sexton was born Anne Gray Harvey in Newton, Massachusetts to Mary Gray (Staples) Harvey (1901–1959) and Ralph Churchill Harvey (1900–1959). She had two older sisters, Jane Elizabeth (Harvey) Jealous (1923–1983) and Blanche Dingley (Harvey) Taylor (1925–2011). She spent most of her childhood in Boston. In 1945 she enrolled at Rogers Hall boarding school in Lowell, Massachusetts, later spending a year at Garland School. For a time she modeled for Boston's Hart Agency. On August 16, 1948, she married Alfred Muller Sexton II and they remained together until 1973. Sexton had her first child, Linda Gray Sexton, in 1953. Her second child, Joyce Ladd Sexton, was born two years later.

Poetry
Sexton suffered from severe bipolar disorder for much of her life, her first manic episode taking place in 1954. After a second episode in 1955 she met Dr. Martin Orne, who became her long-term therapist at the Glenside Hospital. It was Orne who encouraged her to write poetry.

The first poetry workshop she attended was led by John Holmes. Sexton felt great trepidation about registering for the class, asking a friend to make the phone call and accompany her to the first session. She found early acclaim with her poems; a number were accepted by The New Yorker, Harper's Magazine and the Saturday Review. Sexton later studied with Robert Lowell at Boston University alongside poets Sylvia Plath and George Starbuck. Sexton later paid homage to her friendship with Plath in the 1963 poem "Sylvia's Death". Her first volume of poetry, To Bedlam and Part Way Back, was published in 1960, and included the poem "Her Kind", which uses the persecution of witches as an analogy for the oppression of women in a patriarchal society.

Sexton's poetic career was encouraged by her mentor W.D. Snodgrass, whom she met at the Antioch Writer's Conference in 1957. His poem "Heart's Needle" proved inspirational for her in its theme of separation from his three-year-old daughter. Sexton first read the poem at a time when her own young daughter was living with her mother-in-law. She, in turn, wrote "The Double Image", a poem which explores the multi-generational relationship between mother and daughter. Sexton began writing letters to Snodgrass and they became friends.

While working with John Holmes, Sexton encountered Maxine Kumin. They became good friends and remained so for the rest of Sexton's life. Kumin and Sexton rigorously critiqued each other's work and wrote four children's books together. In the late 1960s, the manic elements of Sexton's illness began to affect her career, though she still wrote and published work and gave readings of her poetry. She collaborated with musicians, forming a jazz-rock group called Her Kind that added music to her poetry. Her play Mercy Street, starring Marian Seldes, was produced in 1969 after several years of revisions. Sexton also collaborated with the artist Barbara Swan, who illustrated several of her books.

Within 12 years of writing her first sonnet, she was among the most honored poets in the U.S.: a Pulitzer Prize winner, a fellow of the Royal Society of Literature and the first female member of the Harvard chapter of Phi Beta Kappa.

Death

On October 4, 1974, Sexton had lunch with Kumin to revise galleys for Sexton's manuscript of The Awful Rowing Toward God, scheduled for publication in March 1975 (Middlebrook 396). On returning home she put on her mother's old fur coat, removed all her rings, poured herself a glass of vodka, locked herself in her garage, and started the engine of her car, ending her life by carbon monoxide poisoning.

In an interview over a year before her death, she explained she had written the first drafts of The Awful Rowing Toward God in 20 days with "two days out for despair and three days out in a mental hospital." She went on to say that she would not allow the poems to be published before her death. She is buried at Forest Hills Cemetery & Crematory in Jamaica Plain, Boston, Massachusetts.

Content and themes of work
Sexton is seen as the modern model of the confessional poet due to the intimate and emotional content of her poetry. Sexton often wrote and disclosed her struggles with mental illness through her work. Anne Sexton has also included numerous obscene and repulsive topics, especially for women to talk about publicly. Maxine Kumin described Sexton's work: "She wrote openly about menstruation, abortion, masturbation, incest, adultery, and drug addiction at a time when the proprieties embraced none of these as proper topics for poetry." Sexton's work towards the end of the sixties has been criticized as "preening, lazy and flip" by otherwise respectful critics. Some critics regard her dependence on alcohol as compromising her last work. However, other critics see Sexton as a poet whose writing matured over time. "Starting as a relatively conventional writer, she learned to roughen up her line ... to use as an instrument against the 'politesse' of language, politics, religion [and] sex." Sexton was heavily criticized for her poetic content and themes, but these topics contributed to the popularity of her work.

Her eighth collection of poetry is entitled The Awful Rowing Toward God. The title came from her meeting with a Roman Catholic priest who, unwilling to administer last rites, told her "God is in your typewriter." This gave the poet the desire and willpower to continue living and writing. The Awful Rowing Toward God and The Death Notebooks are among her final works, and both center on the theme of dying.

Her work started out as being about herself, however as her career progressed she made periodic attempts to reach outside the realm of her own life for poetic themes.  Transformations (1971), which is a re-visionary re-telling of Grimm's Fairy Tales, is one such book. (Transformations was used as the libretto for the 1973 opera of the same name by American composer Conrad Susa.)  Later she used Christopher Smart's Jubilate Agno and the Bible as the basis for some of her work.

Much has been made of the tangled threads of her writing, her life and her depression, much in the same way as with Sylvia Plath's suicide in 1963. Robert Lowell, Adrienne Rich and Denise Levertov commented in separate obituaries on the role of creativity in Sexton's death. Levertov says, "We who are alive must make clear, as she could not, the distinction between creativity and self-destruction."

Subsequent controversy
Following one of many suicide attempts and manic or depressive episodes, Sexton worked with therapist Martin Orne. He diagnosed her with what is now described as bipolar disorder, but his competence to do so is called into question by his early use of allegedly unsound psychotherapeutic techniques. During sessions with Anne Sexton he used hypnosis and sodium pentothal to recover supposedly repressed memories. During this process, he allegedly used suggestion to uncover memories of having been abused by her father. This abuse was disputed in interviews with her mother and other relatives. Orne wrote that hypnosis in an adult frequently does not present accurate memories of childhood; instead, "adults under hypnosis are not literally reliving their early childhoods but presenting them through the prisms of adulthood." According to Orne, Anne Sexton was extremely suggestible and would mimic the symptoms of the patients around her in the mental hospitals to which she was committed. Diane Middlebrook's biography states that a separate personality named Elizabeth emerged in Sexton while under hypnosis. Orne did not encourage this development and subsequently this "alternate personality" disappeared. Orne eventually concluded that Anne Sexton was suffering from hysteria. During the writing of the Middlebrook biography, her daughter, Linda Gray Sexton, stated that she had been sexually assaulted by her mother. In 1994, she published her autobiography Searching for Mercy Street: My Journey Back to My Mother, Anne Sexton, which includes her own accounts of the abuse.

Middlebrook published her controversial biography of Anne Sexton with the approval of daughter Linda, Anne's literary executor. For use in the biography, Orne had given Diane Middlebrook most of the tapes recording the therapy sessions between Orne and Anne Sexton. The use of these tapes was met with, as The New York Times put it, "thunderous condemnation". Middlebrook received the tapes after she had written a substantial amount of the first draft of Sexton's biography, and decided to start over. Although Linda Gray Sexton collaborated with the Middlebrook biography, other members of the Sexton family were divided over the book, publishing several editorials and op-ed pieces in The New York Times and The New York Times Book Review.

Controversy continued with the posthumous public release of the tapes (which had been subject to doctor-patient confidentiality). They are said to reveal Sexton's molestation of her daughter Linda, her physically violent behavior toward both her daughters, and her physical altercations with her husband.

Further controversy surrounds allegations that she had an "affair with" the therapist who replaced Orne in the 1960s. No action was taken to censure or discipline the second therapist. Orne considered the "affair" with the second therapist (given the pseudonym "Ollie Zweizung" by Middlebrook and Linda Sexton) to be the catalyst that eventually resulted in her suicide.

Legacy
Peter Gabriel dedicated his song "Mercy Street" (named for her play Mercy Street and inspired by his reading of her poem "45 Mercy Street") from his 1986 album, So, to Sexton. She has been described as a "personal touchstone" for Morrissey, former lead singer and lyricist of The Smiths. She is commemorated on the Boston Women's Heritage Trail. She has also been cited as muse for Madonna, who has talked about her in interviews over the years.

Bibliography

Poetry
To Bedlam and Part Way Back (1960)
All My Pretty Ones (1962)
Live or Die (1966)
Love Poems (1969)
Transformations (1971)
The Book of Folly (1972)
The Death Notebooks (1974)
The Awful Rowing Toward God (1975)
45 Mercy Street (1976)
Words for Dr. Y.: Uncollected Poems (1978)

Prose
Anne Sexton: A Self-Portrait in Letters (1977)

References

Notes

Further reading
 
 
 
 
 
 Golden, Amanda, ed. (2016). This Business of Words: Reassessing Anne Sexton. University Press of Florida. .

External links 

 

  (video)
  of Anne reciting some poetry, and some home movie excerpts. From an Arts Review program from the early 1990s.
 "Requiem For Anne Sexton". Here and Now. November 8, 2007. Interview with daughter Linda Gray Sexton and Robert Clawson who managed the Sexton's experimental band Anne Sexton and Her Kind.
 Anne Sexton's papers  at the Harry Ransom Center at the University of Texas at Austin
 Anne Sexton's art collection  at the Harry Ransom Center at the University of Texas at Austin

American feminist writers
Poets from Massachusetts
Pulitzer Prize for Poetry winners
Boston University faculty
Colgate University faculty
Harvard University people
Oberlin College faculty
Boston University alumni
Suicides by carbon monoxide poisoning
Writing teachers
Suicides in Massachusetts
1928 births
1974 deaths
American women poets
20th-century American poets
20th-century American women writers
1974 suicides
American women academics